Milan Milanović (born 10 January 1963) is a Serbian football manager and former player.

Playing career
After coming through the youth system of Partizan, Milanović played for Zemun in the Yugoslav Second League. He later spent multiple years in Germany, playing for five clubs in the lower leagues. In 1997, Milanović moved to the Faroe Islands and served as player-manager of VB Vágur for two seasons.

Managerial career
After returning to his homeland, Milanović was manager of Zemun in the First League of FR Yugoslavia. He later served as an assistant manager to Boško Đurovski at Rad, before replacing him in May 2003. After the club suffered relegation from the top flight, Milanović continued managing the team in the Second League until January 2004. 

In June 2009, Milanović was named as new manager of Laktaši in the Premier League of Bosnia and Herzegovina, but left the club before the end of the year. He later moved to Moldova and became an assistant to Vitali Rashkevich at Sheriff Tiraspol. In May 2012, Milanović replaced Rashkevich as manager.

In July 2014, Milanović took charge as manager of Serbian SuperLiga side Rad, returning to the club after a decade elsewhere. He was discharged from his position in April 2016. In August 2016, Milanović became manager of Serbian First League side Zemun for the second time, guiding them to promotion to the top flight after 10 seasons. He decided to leave the club in August 2018.

In June 2019, Milanović was appointed as manager of Kazakhstan Premier League side Irtysh Pavlodar.

On 26 September 2021, Milanović was appointed as Head Coach of Alashkert, leaving the role during the winter break when his contract expired. 

On 20 May 2022, Milanović was appointed as the new Head Coach of Kazakhstan Premier League club Tobol.

References

External links
 
 

Association football midfielders
Serbian expatriate football managers
Expatriate football managers in Bosnia and Herzegovina
Expatriate football managers in Kazakhstan
Expatriate football managers in Moldova
Expatriate football managers in the Faroe Islands
Expatriate footballers in Germany
Expatriate footballers in the Faroe Islands
FC Augsburg players
FC Alashkert managers
FC Irtysh Pavlodar managers
FC Sachsen Leipzig players
FC Sheriff Tiraspol managers
FK Čukarički players
FK Hajduk Kula managers
FK Novi Pazar managers
FK Rad managers
FK Radnički Niš managers
FK Laktaši managers
FK Spartak Subotica players
FK Zemun managers
FK Zemun players
OFK Beograd managers
Premier League of Bosnia and Herzegovina managers
Serbia and Montenegro expatriate footballers
Serbia and Montenegro expatriate sportspeople in Germany
Serbia and Montenegro footballers
Serbian expatriate footballers
Serbian expatriate sportspeople in Bosnia and Herzegovina
Serbian expatriate sportspeople in Kazakhstan
Serbian expatriate sportspeople in Moldova
Serbian football managers
Serbian footballers
Serbian SuperLiga managers
Footballers from Belgrade
Yugoslav expatriate footballers
Yugoslav expatriate sportspeople in Germany
Yugoslav footballers
Yugoslav First League players
1963 births
Living people
Moldovan Super Liga managers